Hans Granfelt (26 October 1897 – 5 September 1963) was a Swedish fencer and discus thrower. At the 1920 Summer Olympics he competed in the discus throw and served as the Swedish flag bearer. At 1936 Summer Olympics he competed in the individual and team épée and won a team silver medal. His brothers Nils and Erik were Olympic gymnasts, and his nephew Nils Rydström became an Olympic fencer.

References

External links
 

1897 births
1963 deaths
Sportspeople from Stockholm
Swedish male épée fencers
Swedish male discus throwers
Olympic fencers of Sweden
Olympic athletes of Sweden
Athletes (track and field) at the 1920 Summer Olympics
Fencers at the 1936 Summer Olympics
Olympic silver medalists for Sweden
Olympic medalists in fencing
Medalists at the 1936 Summer Olympics
19th-century Swedish people
20th-century Swedish people